The Tour EP is an EP by Band of Horses, which preceded their debut album, Everything All the Time. The self-released EP was initially sold at shows and was later made available in limited quantities at Sub Pop's website. It features early versions of five tracks from Everything All the Time as well as the otherwise unavailable track "(Biding Time Is A) Boat to Row."

Track listing

References

External links
 Band of Horses official website

Band of Horses albums
2005 debut EPs
Live EPs
Demo albums
2005 live albums
Sub Pop EPs
Sub Pop live albums